Kholile Elvin Gumede, (born 16 May 1988), better known as DJ Clock, is a South African DJ and record producer.

Career

2007-2010: The First Tick (2008), The Second Tick (2009) 
His first  album The First Tick was released on January 6, 2008, in South Africa.

At the  South Africa Music Awards  (2008), The First Tick was nominated for SAMA Awards, as the Best Urban Dance Album and his single "Umahamba Yedwa" as  Record of the Year.

After he established  his owned record label ÄM-PM Productions, his album second studio album The Second Tick was released in 2009.

2010-2014: The Third Tick (2010); The 4th Tick: Clockumentary (2014)
His third  studio album The Third Tick  was released on July, 2010, features Rockboys, DJ Cleo, Bantu Soul, Mpho Maboi.
 
He signed  his label AM-PM production  with Universal Music South Africa, and released his fourth   studio  album  The 4th Tick: Clockumentary, which was commercial  success  certified  platinum  by the Recording Industry of South Africa (RISA).

Discography

Albums
 The First Tick (2008)
 The Second Tick (2009) 
 The Third Tick (2010)
 The 4th Tick: Clockumentary (2014)
 The 5th Tick (2016)

Awards and nominations

References

External links

Living people
South African DJs
South African record producers
South African musicians
Electronic dance music DJs
1988 births